, also known as Funky Forest: The First Encounter or simply Funky Forest, is a 2005 Japanese surrealist anthology comedy film co-written and co-directed by Katsuhito Ishii, Hajime Ishimine and Shunichiro Miki. It is composed of several storylines, some of which coincide, most of which are comical.

Cast
 Tadanobu Asano
 Susumu Terajima
 Ryō Kase as Takefumi
 Rinko Kikuchi
 Mariko Takahashi
 Hideaki Anno
 Moyoco Anno
 Kazue Fukiishi
 Chiduru Ikewaki
 Shihori Kanjiya

Release
The film was released on Region 1 DVD in March 2008.

The film was released on Region Free Blu Ray by Error 4444 together with Third Window Films United States, Canada and Europe in 2021.

References

External links
 
 

2005 films
2000s Japanese-language films
2000s Mandarin-language films
Japanese anthology films
Japanese comedy films
Films directed by Katsuhito Ishii
New People films
2005 comedy films
2000s English-language films
2000s Japanese films